Farzian (also Romanized as Farzīān, Fārisiyān, Fārsīān, Farzeyān, and Farzīyan) is a village in Japelaq-e Sharqi Rural District, Japelaq District, Azna County, Lorestan Province, Iran. At the 2006 census, its population was 1,025, in 299 families.

History 
The site now occupied by Farzian is believed to have been the site of the city of Gabai (گابایی). The fact that this city shared its name with another in Sogdia serves as evidence for the migration of Aryans into Iran from the Central Asians Plains. 

From the 12th to the 16th centuries AD, the most significant site in the Japelaq region was Farzian Castle, a stronghold built by Al-Ajl which often served as a refuge for rebels.

Until the 1970s, Farzian was a popular destination for tourists on account of its beautiful pine groves, vineyards and gardens. However, these were destroyed in droughts following the construction of dams.

Geography 
Farzian village is 0.7 by 0.5km, with an area of 0.35km. It is 32km northeast of the Oshtrankooh mountain range. The village is crossed by the dry beds of two former rivers - the Godara from northwest, and the Jopileh from southwest. 

Farzian has a cold mountainous climate. The average temperature in July (the hottest month of the year) is 25 degrees Celsius, in December (the coldest month of the year) is -3 degrees Celsius, in April it is 12 degrees Celsius and in October it is 15 degrees Celsius. The average annual temperature is 12 degrees Celsius and the annual rainfall is 456.2 mm.

Population 
The 2006 census records a population of 1025 people in 299 families, including 485 men and 540 women. Roughly 66% of the men and 57% of the women are literate. All speak the Luri language, and are Twelver Shiites.

References 

Towns and villages in Azna County